Marc Handley Andrus (born October 20, 1956) is an American bishop of the Episcopal Church (Anglican Communion). He is the current and eighth bishop of the Episcopal Diocese of California. Prior to his election as Bishop of California, Andrus served as a suffragan bishop in the Episcopal Diocese of Alabama.

Life, education and ministry 
Andrus was born in 1956 in Oak Ridge, Tennessee, to Mary Frances and Francis Andrus and was raised in Kingston, Tennessee. He received his Bachelor of Science in plant science from the University of Tennessee, Knoxville in 1979 and a master's degree in social sciences from Virginia Polytechnic Institute and State University in 1982. After receiving his master's degree, Andrus went to work as a regional planner for the Accomack-Northampton Planning District Commission on Virginia's Delmarva Peninsula.

In 1987, Andrus was awarded a Master of Divinity degree from the Virginia Theological Seminary in Alexandria, Virginia. After being ordained deacon on June 20, 1987, he became the senior associate at the Church of the Redeemer in Bryn Mawr, Pennsylvania, and was ordained priest on April 25, 1988.

In 1990, Andrus became the chaplain at Episcopal High School in Alexandria, Virginia, until 1997 when he became rector of Emmanuel Church in Middleburg, Virginia. He remained there until his consecration as bishop suffragan for the Episcopal Diocese of Alabama on February 7, 2002.

Andrus was installed in 2006 as Bishop of California, where he oversees a diocese of approximately 24,000 communicants in the Alameda, Contra Costa, Marin, San Francisco, and San Mateo counties and the cities of Los Altos and part of Palo Alto. His leadership has focused on key issues related to peace and justice, including immigration reform, civil rights for LBGTQ+ persons, health care, housing rights, and climate change.

Early in his tenure as Bishop of California, Andrus co-chaired a community coalition that paved the way for the rebuilding of St. Luke’s Hospital, San Francisco. His climate advocacy work has taken him to the UN Climate Conferences in Paris (COP21), Marrakesh (COP22), Bonn (COP23), and Katowice, Poland (COP24), as well as the Dakota Access Pipeline demonstrations at Standing Rock, North Dakota. Andrus is a member of the We Are Still In Leaders' Circle, a diverse group of ambassadors for American climate action. He also serves on the boards of the Episcopal Impact Fund, the Episcopal School for Deacons, Episcopal Community Services, and the American Bach Soloists, among other organizations. In 2020, he earned his Ph.D. in philosophy and religion from the  California Institute of Integral Studies.

Andrus is married to Sheila Andrus, the former acting director of the Sparkman Center at the University of Alabama at Birmingham's School of Public Health. They have two daughters, Chloé and Pilar.

See also

 List of Episcopal bishops of the United States
 List of bishops of the Episcopal Church in the United States of America

External links

 Episcopal Diocese of California official website
 "My Spiritual Practice and the Climate Crisis", Spiral Magazine, 2020
 "At UN climate conference, Episcopal delegation urges nations to act swiftly and justly", Episcopal News Service, December 12, 2019

1956 births
Episcopal bishops of Alabama
Episcopal bishops of California
Living people
Virginia Theological Seminary alumni
People from Oak Ridge, Tennessee
People from Kingston, Tennessee